The 4th Politburo of the Lao People's Revolutionary Party (LPRP), officially the Political Bureau of the 4th Central Committee of the Lao People's Revolutionary Party, was elected in 1986 by the 1st Plenary Session of the 4th Central Committee, in the immediate aftermath of the 4th National Congress.

By 1990 the Politburo was in bad shape. Souphanouvong was convalescing from a stroke he suffered in 1986, Nouhak Phoumsavan began failing intermittently and Kaysone Phomvihane was suffering from several bouts of illness.

Members

References

Specific

Bibliography 
Books:
 

Articles and journals:
 
 
 

4th Politburo of the Lao People's Revolutionary Party
1986 establishments in Laos
1991 disestablishments in Laos